Cicatrisestoloides costaricensis is a species of beetle in the family Cerambycidae, and the only species in the genus Cicatrisestoloides. It was described by Breuning and Heyrovsky in 1964.

References

Desmiphorini
Beetles described in 1964
Monotypic Cerambycidae genera